Creekmoor is a ward in Poole, Dorset. Since 2019, the ward has elected 2 councillors to Bournemouth, Christchurch and Poole Council.

History 
The ward formerly elected three councillors to Poole Borough Council.

Geography 
The ward covers the suburbs of Creekmoor and Waterloo.

Councillors

Election results

2019

2015

2011

2007

References 

Politics of Poole
Wards of Bournemouth, Christchurch and Poole